Kizhuparamba or Keezhuparamba is a village and Panchayath on the northern boundary of Malappuram District In Kerala State of India.

Kizhuparamba is situated on the banks of the Chaliyar river and in the border of Malappuram and Kozhikode districts. Kizhuparamba is one of the smallest Panchayaths in Malappuram district.Kizhuparamba Panchayat was formed on 1 August 1977 from the former Urngattiri Panchayat. It has geographical area of 14.99 km2, which is 0.42 percent of the total area of the Malappuram District.Kerala State Highway (SH) 34 (Koyilandy-Edavanna) passes through Kizhuparamba Village

Coordinates

It is located at the end of Malapuram district. Three parts are surrounded by the river Chaliyar, which makes it a peninsula. As the land if fertile, most of the peoples are farmers. Total population is around 20,000. Muslim religion constitutes the majority religion, with over 90% of the population reporting as Muslims.

Etymology
The name Kizhuparamba is derived from Keezhparamba which means "Low land" in Malayalam language. "Keezh" means "low" and "Paramba"  means "land" .The name is believed to be attributed to the peculiar low geography of majority areas of the village (situated in the valley of many small hills like Thadapparamba, Pazhamparamba and Melapparamba). Some of the areas in the village lies below the monsoon water level of Chaliyar river and gets submerged under river water during monsoon months.
Another place in Kizhuparamba village is Kuniyil which also has a similar meaning.

Neighboring places and geographical boundaries

North: , Pannikod, Thottumukkam (Kozhikode District) South, East and West: Chaliyar River and Cherupuzha (Tributary of Chaliyar near Areacode) Urngattiri, Areacode, Cheekode and Vazhakkad Panchayaths.

Major locations

Kizhuparamba: Kizhuparamba Town, Kinattin Kandy, Pazhamparamba, Kallingal, Melaparamba, North Kizhuparamba. Pallikkunnu
Kizhuparamba South: Othupallipuraya, Chankulam, Kadavu
Kuniyil: New Bazar, South Kuniyil (Anvar Nagar), Ariyanipotta (Wadinoor), Melaparamba, Nellerimmal
Kuttooli: Kuttooli, Parakkad, Kunhan Padi, Poovathikandy.
Thrikkalayoor: Kallittappalam, Alumkandi, Karuvad, Puliyaaparambu, Kavilada
Valillappuzha: Valillapuzha Town, Kallai, Muthodu, Arikkuzhikkad
Pathanapuram: Parakkad, Pallippadi Junction, Shanthinagar, West Pathanapuram, Valapra

History
It is believed that Tippu Sultan (1782–1799)'s army has used Kizhuparamba in their route from Feroke to Mysore. There was a very old route from Perunkadavu (Kuniyil)-Thrikkalayur-Kodityathur-Thamarassery-Mysore.Many brave natives of Kizhuparamba had participated in Indian independence movement (the prominent people being P.P Sankaran Master). Kizhuparamba was one of the main centres of the Khilafat movement in 1920s .

Cultural and Educational Movements

In the early years of the twentieth century, Muslim movements have contributed to the educational and cultural upbringing of the panchayath. "Vayanasala Prasthanam" (Local Libraries Movement) was deep rooted in Thrikkalayur, Kuniyil, Kizhuparamba and Pathanapuram and developed the political and cultural awareness of the society. The first educational institution in the panchayath was established at Kallingal in 1910 as a primary school.

Educational institutions

Colleges
 Anvarul Islam Arabic College, Kuniyil (Aided)
 Kunhathumma Memorial College of Teacher Education, Thekkinchuvadu (Self-Finance)
 Anvar ITI (Private)

High School
 Govt. Vocational Higher Secondary School, Kizhuparamba
 Al Anvar High School, Kuniyil

Primary Schools:
 AMLP School, Kallingal
 Govt. Lower Primary School, Kizhuparamba (Pallikkunnu)
 Govt. Lower Primary School, Kuniyil (South)
 GMLP School Kuniyil (North-Alumkandi)
 MALP School, Valillapuzha (Govt. Aided)
 Govt. Lower Primary School, Pathanapuram
 MKKHUP School, Parakkad (Govt. Aided)
 Jyothidhara Upper Primary School (Private)
 Hira Public School Kizhuparamba North (Private)
 Grace Public School, Kuniyil (Private)
 Vedavyasa Vidyalayam Thrikkalayoor (Private)

Pre-Primary Schools:
 Iqra' Public School Kizhuparamba (Private Pre-school, LKG & UKG)
 Learn Well Pre-Primary School Thrikkalayoor (Private)

Places of worship
 Thrikkalayoor Sri Mahadeva Temple
 Eeswaramangalam Shiva Temple, Shanthinagar
 St. Mary's Church. Valillappuzha
 Goshalakkal Srikrishna Temple
 Kallingal Juma Masjid Kallingal, Kizhuparamba
 Irippankulam Juma Masjid
 Vishnu Temple Pathanapuram
 Masjid Al Rumi, Kizhuparamba south
 Masjidul Huda, New Bazar, Kuniyil
 Masjidu Sunniyya, Kuniyil
 Masjidul Bushra
 Assasu Thaqwa Sunni Juma Masjid, Kizhuparamba
 Anvar Juma Masjid, New Bazar, Kuniyil
 Anvar Juma Masjid, Anvar Nagar, Kuniyil
 Sunni Masjid, Oatupalli, Purai Town
 Al huda town juma masjid kizhuparamba
 Choorott juma masjid kizhuparamba
 
 Masjid Zainabi 'Thrikkalayoor'

Notable Enterprises
 Gramafone Mobile Application
 Kizhuparamba Service Co-Operative Bank Ltd
 Kizhuparamba Vanitha Sahakarana Sangham Ltd
 Eranad Construction Company Pvt Ltd, Kizhuparamba
 Chaliyar Constructions Pvt Ltd, Kizhuparamba
 Naila Travels Pvt Ltd, Kuniyil
 Thekkichuvadu Granites Pvt Ltd, Thekkinchuvadu
 Foodzie Ventures Pvt Ltd, Kuniyil
 Perumal Associates Pvt Ltd, Kuttooli
 Afreash Learnings And Careers Pvt Ltd, Pathanapuram
 Arableaqua Agro Eco Farming Pvt Ltd, Kuttooli
 Grandmark Bricks Pvt Ltd, Pathanapuram
 Linthas Enterprises Pvt Ltd, Kizhuparamba
 Aevea Global Traders Pvt Ltd, Kuniyil
 Ablaze Chits Pvt Ltd, Pathanapuram
 Shabco Technologies Pvt Ltd, Pathanapuram
 Pravasalokham Online News Portal, Kuniyil
 Fiesta events and Catering, Kizhuparamba
 Blue Marine Plywoods, Kuttooly
 Lemat Tiles & Sanitaries, Kuttooly
 MP Sounds and Decorations, Kuniyil, Kizhuparamba & Valillapuzha
 KK Store, Kuniyil & Kizhuparamba
 Budget Homes Hardwares, Kuttooly
 Studio Rose Photo & Videography, Kuniyil
 Page India Publishers, Kuniyil
 Oushadhi Ayurvedic Centre, Kuniyil
 Eranad Travel And Tourism, Kuniyil
 Hake Group of Companies, Valillapuzha
 KEA Super Market, Kunhan Padi
 Brain Medicals, Kuniyil

High School
 Govt. Vocational Higher Secondary School, Kizhuparamba
 Al Anvar High School, Kuniyil

Other specialities of Kizhuparamba
 Buffalo/cow racing (Kaalapoottu).
 Boat Race (Vallam Kali)
 Sevens Football Tournaments

Transportation
Kizhuparamba village connects to other parts of India through Feroke town on the west and Nilambur town on the east.  National highway No.66 passes through Pulikkal and the northern stretch connects to Goa and Mumbai.  The southern stretch connects to Cochin and Trivandrum.  State Highway No.28 starts from Nilambur and connects to Ooty, Mysore and Bangalore through Highways.12,29 and 181. The nearest airport is at Kozhikode.  The nearest major railway station is at Feroke.
Areekode Bridge, Perumkadavu bridge and Edasserykadavu bridge connect various places in Areekode Panchayath with Pathanapuram, Kuniyil, and Kizhuparamba of Kizhuparamba Panchayath. The small bridge across cherupuzha at Pathanapuram connects Therattammal of Urangattiri Panchayath.

References

External links
 Kizhuparamba on Wikimapia

Villages in Malappuram district
Kondotty area